Aleksandr Pushtov (born 9 March 1964) is a football coach and a retired footballer from Estonia, who holds Russian citizenship. He was the manager of FCI Tallinn from 2011 to 2017. Under his management FCI climbed to the Estonian top tier, won their first Estonian championship in 2016, Estonian cup and Estonian Supercup in 2017 title.

International career
Pushtov obtained a total number of ten caps for the Estonia national football team during the early 1990s, scoring one goal in Estonia's first (official) international match on 3 June 1992 against Slovenia.

References

External links
 FIFA.com
 

1964 births
Living people
Estonian footballers
Russian footballers
Estonia international footballers
Association football defenders
Estonian football managers
Estonian people of Russian descent
FCI Levadia Tallinn managers
Expatriate footballers in Finland
FCI Tallinn managers
FC Dynamo Vologda players
FC Nikol Tallinn players
FC Norma Tallinn players
FC Ajax Lasnamäe players
FC TVMK players